Cristiolus was a Welsh saint who lived in the 6th century.

According to tradition, he was a son of Hywel, son of Emyr Llydaw and therefore brother to Sulien, Rhystud and Derfel Firm, and perhaps also Dwywe (or Dwywau).

There are churches dedicated to Cristiolus at Llangristiolus, Anglesey, together with Eglwyswrw and Penrhydd (Pembrokeshire).  He is commemorated on Nov. 3.

References

Medieval Welsh saints